Creagan was a railway station located on the north shore of Loch Creran  north of the Creagan Inn in Argyll and Bute. It was on the Ballachulish branch line that linked Connel Ferry, on the main line of the Callander and Oban Railway, with Ballachulish.

History 

Creagan was the only station on the Ballachulish branch that had an island platform. There was a siding to the east of the platform, on the north side of the railway.

One platform was taken out of use on 1 April 1927.

The station was host to a LMS caravan in 1935 and 1936 followed by two caravans from 1937 to 1939. A camping coach was also positioned here by the Scottish Region from 1961 to 1964.

This station closed on 28 March 1966, when the Ballachulish Branch of the Callander and Oban Railway was closed.

Signalling 
Throughout its existence, the Ballachulish Branch was worked by the electric token system. Creagan signal box, which had 21 levers, was situated on the island platform.

The signal box and crossing loop were taken out of use on 1 April 1927.

References

Notes

Sources

Further reading 
 
 
 

Railway stations in Great Britain opened in 1903
Railway stations in Great Britain closed in 1966
Disused railway stations in Argyll and Bute
Beeching closures in Scotland
Former Caledonian Railway stations
1903 establishments in Scotland